Polytechnic University of the Philippines (PUP), Parañaque is a satellite campus of Polytechnic University of the Philippines located in Parañaque, Philippines. It was founded on 2011.

Academics

Degree Courses

 Bachelor of Science in Computer Engineering
 Bachelor of Science in Hospitality Management
 Bachelor of Science in Information Technology
 Diploma in Office Management Technology

Diploma Courses

 Diploma in Computer Engineering Technology
 Diploma in Information Communication Technology
 Diploma in Office Management Technology

Citations

Footnotes

External links
 Polytechnic University of the Philippines – Official website

Education in Parañaque
Educational institutions established in 2011
Polytechnic University of the Philippines
2011 establishments in the Philippines
State universities and colleges in Metro Manila